Trichodes apiarius is a beetle species of checkered beetles belonging to the family Cleridae, subfamily Clerinae.

These beetles are found in most of Europe, in the eastern Palearctic realm, and in North Africa.

It is a hairy, small beetle with shining blue or black head and scutellum. The elongated elytra show a bright red colour with black bands. This species can easily be distinguished from Trichodes alvearius for the black terminal band reaching the apex of elytra.

At the larval stage, these beetles are parasites of bees (hence the name “apiarius”), as the adults lay the eggs in the nests of solitary bees (Osmia and Megachile species) or in hives of honey bees, eating larvae and nymphs of their victims.

However, they integrate their diet with small insects that they actively hunt.

References

External links
Biolib

apiarius
Beetles of Europe
Beetles described in 1758
Taxa named by Carl Linnaeus